Kvarnerska Rivijera is one of the oldest youth football tournaments in the world, first played in 1953. The tournament is organised by HNK Rijeka, a Croatian football club, and attracts clubs from across Europe and other continents. It is held each year during the May–June period in Rijeka, Croatia, and its surroundings, including towns in the Istria County, the Primorje-Gorski Kotar County and the Lika-Senj County. The final is commonly played in Rijeka. Until 2014, the tournament has been contested by under-19 club sides, with occasional national team participation. From 2015, the tournament features under-17 club sides.

History 
The tournament was first played in 1953, becoming Europe's third oldest youth football tournament after Torneo di Viareggio and Bellinzona tournament. Hajduk Split were the first winners and 1860 München the first international side to compete. Each year there were 16 participants, with the exception of 1972 and 1976–80 (32 teams), and 1985 and 2002 (24 teams). Rijeka's Ivan Kocjančić and Marijan Brnčić participated in the tournament five times, making them the record holders for most appearances.

Numerous later notable footballers have played in the tournament during their youth, including Dino Zoff, Pietro Carmignani, Giovanni Galli, Gerd Müller, Paul Breitner, Joe Jordan, Terry Yorath, Pierluigi Casiraghi, Robert Prosinečki, Alen Bokšić, Zvonimir Boban and Davor Šuker.

A number of national under-19 sides have also taken part in the tournament, including Albania, Czechoslovakia, Ireland, Macedonia, United States, Tunisia, Oman, Iraq, China, Japan and South Korea.

The hosts, Rijeka, are the most successful side, winning 20 tournaments, followed by Hajduk Split with 12 titles.

Format and participating teams (2019) 
The 67th edition of the tournament was played from 27 May to 2 June 2019. The tournament featured 16 teams divided into 4 groups, played in Kostrena, Labin, Novi Vinodolski and Rovinj. The group fixtures were played in a single round-robin format. The top two teams in each of the four groups qualified for the first knock-out round. Two one-legged knock-out rounds were played in Mavrinci, Rovinj and Kostrena. This was followed by a one-off final and third-place play-off in Krimeja on 2 June 2019.

Croatian teams
  Dinamo Zagreb
  Orijent
  Osijek
  Pomorac 1921
  Rijeka
  Rovinj
  Rudar
  Vinodol

International teams
  Albania U19
  Željezničar
  Udinese
  Venezia
  Vardar
  DAC 1904
  Maribor
  Olimpija

Winners

By year
Note: Parentheses indicates the score after the penalty shoot-out.

By club

References

External links
Official website 
RSSSF Kvarnerska Rivijera

HNK Rijeka
Youth football competitions
Croatian football friendly trophies
Sport in Rijeka
1953 establishments in Croatia
Youth football in Croatia